Castellaniella daejeonensis is a Gram-negative, oxidase and catalase-positive, facultatively anaerobic, non-spore-forming, motile bacterium from the genus  Castellaniella, isolated from oil-contaminated soil.

References

External links
Type strain of Castellaniella daejeonensis at BacDive -  the Bacterial Diversity Metadatabase

Burkholderiales
Bacteria described in 2010